Eusebio Ríos Fernández (30 March 1935 – 10 May 2008) was a Spanish football defender and manager.

Playing career
Born in Portugalete, Biscay, Ríos started his career in his native Basque Country, representing two teams. In 1958 he moved to Andalusia after signing with Real Betis, going on to play ten seasons with the club (nine in La Liga) before retiring in 1968 at 33 years of age; his debut in the top flight occurred on 21 September 1958 in a 4–2 win against Sevilla FC, in what was the first official match played at the Ramón Sánchez Pizjuán Stadium.

Ríos earned one cap for Spain, playing the second half of a 1–2 friendly loss with Portugal in Porto, on 15 November 1964.

Coaching career
Ríos began coaching in 1970, shortly after retiring. After two years with Real Jaén in the third division and three with Barakaldo CF in the second, he signed with Recreativo de Huelva in the latter level, achieving the oldest club in Spain's first-ever top flight promotion, followed by immediate relegation.

In the following years, Ríos helped another two teams promote to the top division, Real Valladolid and Real Murcia, spending three seasons with the latter. After one and a half seasons with Deportivo de La Coruña in the second tier he was appointed at former side Betis, being sacked on 30 November 1988 after a 2–6 away loss against Atlético Madrid, in a relegation-ending season; he later worked with the club as director of football.

Ríos' last manager job was with Rayo Vallecano (two seasons), being one of two coaches in the 1991–92 campaign – the other was a young José Antonio Camacho – as the Madrid outskirts team returned to the top flight. He was part of Athletic Bilbao's coaching staff in two separate seasons (1997–98 and 2001–02).

Personal life
Ríos' son, Roberto, was also a footballer and a defender. He played his entire career with Betis and Athletic Bilbao, also going on to represent the national team.

Death
Ríos died in his hometown of Portugalete on 10 May 2008, at the age of 73.

References

External links

1935 births
2008 deaths
People from Portugalete
Sportspeople from Biscay
Spanish footballers
Footballers from the Basque Country (autonomous community)
Association football defenders
La Liga players
Segunda División players
Arenas Club de Getxo footballers
SD Indautxu footballers
Real Betis players
Spain international footballers
Spanish football managers
La Liga managers
Segunda División managers
Real Jaén managers
Barakaldo CF managers
Recreativo de Huelva managers
Real Valladolid managers
Real Murcia managers
Deportivo de La Coruña managers
Real Betis managers
Rayo Vallecano managers
Athletic Bilbao non-playing staff